The Muhlenberg Mules are the collegiate athletic teams of Muhlenberg College in Allentown, Pennsylvania. The college competes in NCAA Division III of the National Collegiate Athletic Association (NCAA). Muhlenberg has 22 intercollegiate sports, which belong to either the Centennial Conference or Eastern College Athletic Conference (ECAC).

Both men's and women's teams exist for basketball, cross country, golf, lacrosse, soccer, tennis, and track and field. Men's teams exist for baseball, football, and wrestling; women have teams for softball, field hockey, and volleyball.

Facilities

The football, field hockey, and track and field teams each play their home games at Scotty Wood Stadium, a 3,000-capacity stadium built in 1999 on the Muhlenberg College campus at 3400 West Chew Street. The basketball, wrestling, and volleyball teams play at Memorial Hall, an indoor arena located on the campus at 2346 Liberty Street.

Additional athletic facilities were built west of the field house in 1999. Updated tennis courts were built in 2003, and two fields were added in 1997 and 1998. The baseball and softball teams do not have on-campus facilities.

Football

1900 to 1945

In 1900, Muhlenberg launched its football program, which was the college's first varsity sport. In 1925, Haps Benfer became Muhlenberg head football coach, and the team finished the 1925 season 6-3-1.

From 1936 to 1945, Doggie Julian was head coach. He recorded a career record of 56–49–2. Julian was also head basketball coach during this time and, from 1942 to 1944, head baseball coach.

1946 to 1997

In 1946, Ben Schwartzwalder became head football coach. In his first season, he guided the Mules to a 9–1 record and a national championship with Muhlenberg defeating St. Bonaventure University in the Tobacco Bowl. The following year, in the 1947 season, Schwartzwalder again led the Mules to a 9–1 record; the season's only loss came by one point, in a 7–6 loss at Temple. The Mules declined an invitation that season to appear in the Tangerine Bowl. In 1949, Schwartzwalder departed to coach Syracuse.

1997 to 2018
Mike Donnelly became the head football coach in 1997. Despite a 1–9 inaugural season, Donnelly turned the team around; from 2000 to 2004, the Mules won five straight Centennial Conference championships and earned five straight postseason berths. In 2007, the Mules again won the Centennial Conference and received another berth in the NCAA playoffs, winning their first-round game before falling in the second round. Donnelly's team won the Centennial Conference again in 2008 and earned a playoff berth, but lost in the playoff's first round. In 2010, they returned to the playoffs with the same result.

Since the 2000 season, Muhlenberg has compiled a 66–28 overall record in the Centennial Conference, second best among all active and former members behind only Johns Hopkins University. Seven times in the 2000s, the Muhlenberg football team won the Centennial Conference championship.

2018 to present

Nate Milne became Muhlenberg's head football coach in the 2018 season. He has a 35–5 record over his first three seasons. In 2019, he was named AFCA Coach of the Year Award for NCAA Division III.

Club teams
In addition to its 22 NCAA teams, Muhlenberg has sports club teams in ultimate frisbee and women's rugby.

References

External links

Muhlenberg College